Romaine is both a surname and a given name. It may refer to:

People
Barbara Romaine (born 1959), American academic and translator of Arabic literature
Irving Romaine (born 1972), Bermudian cricketer
Suzanne Romaine (born 1951), American linguist
William Romaine (1714–1795), evangelical divine
Romaine Brooks (1874–1970), American painter
Romaine Foege (born 1938), American politician
Romaine Fielding (1868–1927), American actor, screenwriter and film director
Romaine Patterson (born 1978), American gay rights activist, radio personality, and author
Romaine Morrison, Jamaican cricketer
Romaine Quinn (born 1990), American politician
Romaine-la-Prophétesse (born ), Haitian planter and revolutionary

Fictional characters
Ruby Romaine, portrayed by Tracey Ullman in the television series Tracey Takes On...
Romaine Vole, in Agatha Christie's short story and play "Witness for the Prosecution"

See also
W. H. Romaine-Walker (1854–1940), English architect
Paul Romaines (born 1955), English cricketer

Unisex given names